The Far Side of the Moon is a 2000 play by Quebec playwright Robert Lepage. Written in collaboration with Adam Nashman and Peder Bjurman, the play features an original score by Laurie Anderson, and marionettes by Pierre Robitaille and Sylvie Courbron. The play has been staged in many cities around the world to wide acclaim, and has received numerous awards. Lepage wrote, directed, and starred in a film adaptation of the play, which was released in 2003.

Awards
 Paul Hébert Award for Best Actor (2001)
 Time Out Award for Best Play (2001)
 Evening Standard Theatre Awards for Best Play (2001)
 Barclays Theatre Awards for Best Touring Production (2001)
 Critics' Circle Theatre Award for Best Director (2001)
 Golden Mask Festival award for Best Foreign Production  (2007)

References

Quebec plays
Canadian plays adapted into films
2000 plays